Adrien Maurice Victurnien Mathieu de Noailles, 8th Duke of Noailles (22 September 1869 – 23 October 1953), son of Jules Charles Victurnien de Noailles, acceded to the title of Duke of Noailles on his father's death in 1895. He was succeeded by his nephew, François de Noailles.

Family
He married Yolande Louise Marie Valentine d'Albert de Luynes (6 August 1870, Dampierre – 18 October 1952, Cannes) on 5 December 1892; they had children:
 Jean Maurice Paul Jules de Noailles, duc d'Ayen (18 September 1893, Paris – 14 April 1945, Bergen-Belsen)
 Yolande Marie Clothilde Charlotte (2 January 1896, Paris – 27 November 1976)
 Elisabeth Pauline Sabine Marie (27 October 1898, Maintenon – 7 December 1969, Paris

Equestrian
He competed in the mail coach event at the 1900 Summer Olympics.

References

External links

Adrien-Maurice
Adrien-Maurice
Adrien
Noailles, Adrien-Maurice, 8th duc de
Noailles, Adrien-Maurice, 8th duc de
Equestrians at the 1900 Summer Olympics
French male equestrians
Olympic equestrians of France